Janowitz is a surname. Notable people with the surname include:

Gundula Janowitz (born 1937), Austrian singer
Hans Janowitz (1890–1954), Czech-German writer
Morris Janowitz (1919–1988), American sociologist
Tama Janowitz (born 1957), American writer
Will Janowitz (born 1980), American actor

See also
Vrchotovy Janovice, Czechia (formerly Janowitz)
Jannowitz
Jannowitz Bridge